Mae West (1893–1980) was  an American actress, playwright, and screenwriter.

Mae West may also refer to:
 Mae West (film), a 1982 telefilm
 Mae West (life preserver)
 Mae West (sculpture), a sculpture in Munich
 MAE-West, an Internet exchange point in California, United States
 M2A2 tank or Mae West, a pre–World War II M2 light tank variant
 Lady May or Mae West, American rapper
 Debi Mae West (born 1963), American voice actor

See also 
 Mae West Lips Sofa, a 1937 a surrealist sofa by Salvador Dalí
 May West, dessert cake

West, Mae